The Measurements of Student Progress (MSP), successor to the WASL, was a test taken by students throughout Washington state, ranging from grades 3–8. The SBAC has taken its place.

Subjects 
The MSP tested Mathematics, Science, Reading, and Writing. 
 Mathematics consisted of multiple choice questions with skills learned in the grade. 
 Reading consisted of multiple choice questions and free response questions. Students read a story then answered the questions. 
 Writing consisted of writing two stories. A prompt was included. 
 Science included multiple choice questions related to different science processes. There was a sample lab in which the student conducted analysis and conclusion. 
Mathematics and Reading were tested in grades 3–8. Science was tested in grades 5 and 8. Writing was tested in grades 4 and 7.

References

Standardized tests in the United States

(All of the information comes from this page.)